The  were a projected class of destroyer of the Imperial Japanese Navy (IJN), developed during the Second World War. The intention was to develop a mass-production destroyer based on the experimental destroyer . The IJN Fleet Command gave them the project number V6. However, the project was cancelled with none of the proposed ships being completed, because the IJN was heavily crippled at Midway in June 1942.

They were a lengthened version of the Yūgumo-class destroyer. These destroyers carried the most torpedoes out of any destroyer in the war, but no torpedo reloads were carried. Such a payload of torpedoes could've sunk a heavily armoured battleship in one go. A potent destroyer, they came too late in the war to do anything that could've changed the situation.

General characteristics

It displaced 2,570 tonnes at standard load and 3,048 tonnes at full load. It was powered by 3 Kampon water-tube boilers which fed steam to two Kampon geared steam turbines at two shafts, giving 75,000 shaft horsepower (55 MW). This allowed her to reach speeds exceeding .

Armament

The main battery consisted of six 127 mm (5.0 in)/50 cal DP guns. Like all other Japanese destroyers these had a quite low rate of fire. The turrets that they are mounted on also were pretty slow at turning. They also carried an unknown number of Type 96 25 mm anti-aircraft guns, and an unknown number of Type 44 depth charges. For their torpedo, they carried 15 610 mm torpedo tubes which launch the Type 93 torpedoes.

Ships in class

Bibliography
Rekishi Gunzō, History of Pacific War Vol.23 Akizuki class destroyers, Gakken (Japan), 1999, 
Collection of writings by Sizuo Fukui Vol.5, Stories of Japanese Destroyers, Kōjinsha (Japan) 1993, 

Destroyers of the Imperial Japanese Navy
World War II destroyers of Japan
Destroyer classes
Proposed ships